The Mattagami Railroad was a Canadian railway that operated  of track in Ontario for freight and passenger services from 1927 to 1998 with the passenger service ending in 1966. The road  was taken over by Ontario Northland. They operated from the National Transcontinental Railway's mainline to a mill owned by Abitibi Fibre company in Smooth Rock Falls.

Known Fleet:
2-6-0 steam
4-6-0 steam
50 toner diesel
S-4 diesel
GP7 diesel

References

1927 establishments in Ontario
1998 disestablishments in Ontario
Defunct Ontario railways
Ontario Northland Railway
Railway companies disestablished in 1998
Railway companies established in 1927
Canadian companies established in 1927
Standard gauge railways in Canada
Rail transport in Cochrane District